Cool Boarders 2001 is a snowboarding video game developed by Idol Minds and published by Sony Computer Entertainment for the PlayStation and PlayStation 2. It is the only Cool Boarders title to be released only in North America.

Reception

The PlayStation 2 version received "generally favorable reviews", while the PlayStation version received "mixed" reviews, according to the review aggregation website Metacritic. Samuel Bass of NextGen said of the latter console version in its January 2001 issue, "A pre-SSX game in a post-SSX era, Cool Boarders 2001 is simply too little, too late." Six issues later, Jeff Lundrigan said of the former console version, "It's not the worst snowboarding game you've ever played, but there are far better ones out there."

References

External links
 

2000 video games
Deck Nine games
Multiplayer and single-player video games
North America-exclusive video games
PlayStation (console) games
PlayStation 2 games
Snowboarding video games
Sony Interactive Entertainment games
Video games developed in the United States